Zeynabad (also Romanized as Zeynābād andZīnābād; also known as Zain Abad Hoomeh and Zeynābād-e Ḩūmeh) is a village in Dehqanan Rural District, in the Central District of Kharameh County, Fars Province, Iran. At the 2006 census, its population was 256, in 62 families.

References 

Populated places in Kharameh County